Madison Park is a neighborhood in east central Seattle, Washington, USA, named after the city park at the foot of E. Madison Street on the Lake Washington shore. It is bounded on the east by Lake Washington; on the south by the intersection of Lake Washington Boulevard E. and 39th Avenue E., beyond which is Denny-Blaine; on the west by Lake Washington Boulevard E.; and on the north by Union Bay.
Washington Park and the private Broadmoor community and golf course are subunits within Madison Park. The neighborhood's main thoroughfares are E. Madison Street (northeast- and southwest-bound) and McGilvra Boulevard E. (north- and southbound).

Madison Park in the early 1900s was a popular destination for people who lived in Downtown Seattle and continues to draw from Capitol Hill and beyond, especially on warmer days. Though very close to the city center, it was seen as a summer getaway, with a cable car leading over the hills to the lake, park, swimming beach and ferries to destinations across Lake Washington.

Today, Madison Park is an upscale residential community with a number of restaurants and eateries.
 
Madison Park's Pioneer Hall (also known as Washington Pioneer Hall) is listed on the National Register of Historic Places, ID #70000645.

External links
Seattle City Clerk: Madison Park neighborhood